is a Japanese men's magazine devoted to pop culture, lifestyles, and culture in Tokyo, Japan by Magazine House.

History and profile
Brutus was started in 1980. The first issue of the magazine appeared in May 1980. The publisher is Tokyo-based company, Magazine House. The magazine was published monthly and biweekly. It is now published on a bimonthly basis. It has sister publications, an an, Popeye, and Olive. A popular magazine, Brutus had a circulation of 88,543  with a target audience of 20- to 50-year-old trend-conscious males. One of its former editors-in-chief is Kazuhiro Saito.

In 2013, the magazine and Popeye received best magazine award.

References

External links
 

1980 establishments in Japan
Bi-monthly magazines
Biweekly magazines
Lifestyle magazines published in Japan
Magazines established in 1980
Magazines published in Tokyo
Men's magazines published in Japan
Monthly magazines published in Japan